The Laurence Olivier Award for Best Actress in a Musical is an annual award presented by the Society of London Theatre in recognition of achievements in commercial London theatre. The awards were established as the Society of West End Theatre Awards in 1976, and renamed in 1984 in honour of English actor and director Laurence Olivier.

This award was introduced in 1979, along with the award for Best Actor in a Musical. In 1977 and 1978, there had been a commingled actor/actress award for Best Performance in a Musical, won both times by an actress.

Winners and nominees

1970s

1980s

1990s

2000s

2010s

2020s

Multiple awards and nominations for Best Actress in a Musical

Awards
Three awards
Imelda Staunton

Two awards
Barbara Dickson
Maria Friedman
Julia McKenzie
Joanna Riding
Samantha Spiro

Nominations
Seven nominations
Imelda Staunton

Six nominations
Maria Friedman

Five nominations
Ruthie Henshall
Julia McKenzie
Joanna Riding

Four nominations
Elaine Paige

Three nominations
Elena Roger
Jenna Russell
Sheridan Smith
Hannah Waddingham

Two nominations

Multiple awards and nominations for a character

Awards
2 awards
Eliza Doolittle from My Fair Lady
Miss Adelaide from Guys and Dolls
Mrs. Lovett from Sweeney Todd: The Demon Barber of Fleet Street
The Baker's Wife from Into the Woods

Nominations
5 nominations
Miss Adelaide from Guys and Dolls
Norma Desmond from Sunset Boulevard

3 nominations
Eliza Doolittle from My Fair Lady
Lilli Vanessi / Katharine from Kiss Me, Kate
Mrs. Johnstone from Blood Brothers
Mrs. Lovett from Sweeney Todd: The Demon Barber of Fleet Street

2 nominations

See also
 Tony Award for Best Actress in a Leading Role in a Musical
Drama Desk Award for Outstanding Actress in a Leading Role in a Musical

References

External links
 

Actress
Theatre acting awards
Awards for actresses